XHWN-FM is a radio station on 93.9 FM in Torreón, Coahuila, Mexico. The station is owned by Multimedios Radio with the latter's the Telediario Radio news format. The transmitter is located atop Cerro de las Noas.

History

XEWN-AM 1270 received its concession on November 9, 1964. The station was owned by Alejandro O. Stevenson and broadcast from Gómez Palacio, Durango.

The station was sold to Promotora Radiofónica de la Laguna in 2000 and migrated to FM in 2011.

In 2019, Multimedios Radio took control of the entire Radio Centro Torreón cluster; Radio Recuerdo, which had been on XHBP-FM 90.3, began simulcasting on the 93.9 frequency.

References

Radio stations in Coahuila
Radio stations in the Comarca Lagunera
Radio stations established in 1964
1964 establishments in Mexico
Multimedios Radio